
Edmund Freeman (1764–1807) was a printer and publisher in Boston, Massachusetts, in the late 18th century.  He published the Boston Magazine and the Herald of Freedom newspaper. He worked with Loring Andrews as "Freeman and Andrews, printers, State-Street, north side State-House."  As editor of the Herald of Freedom, he was sued for libel in 1790 by Massachusetts legislator John Gardiner; Freeman won the case.

Freeman came to Boston from Sandwich, Massachusetts. He was a son of Brigadier General Nathaniel Freeman and Tryphosa Colton. He married Elizabeth Pattee (died 1866); children were William Freeman (1797–1829) and Ann Freeman (1798–1857). He died in 1807, at age 43.

References

Further reading

Published/printed by Freeman
 Boston Magazine (1783–1786)
 Weatherwise's Almanack for the Year 1789. Boston: Printed and Sold by Edmund Freeman, 1788.
 Herald of Freedom (Boston newspaper), (1790–1791)

About Freeman
 From the Centinel. Proceedings on the Examination of the Printer of the Herald. Herald of Freedom, Date: 02-12-1790
 Massachusetts. Boston, February 1. Vermont Journal, and the Universal Advertiser; Date: 02-17-1790.
 [Account of the trial]. Herald of Freedom; Date: 03-04-1791.
 Supreme Judicial Court; trial for a libel: Commonwealth vs. Freeman. Herald of Freedom; Date: 03-11-1791
 Trial for a Libel. Middlesex Gazette (Connecticut); Date: 03-26-1791

1764 births
1807 deaths
Businesspeople from Boston
18th century in Boston
American publishers (people)
American printers